Alexander Vasilyevich Svinin (born 7 July 1958) is a Russian ice dancing coach and former competitor for the Soviet Union. With Olga Volozhinskaya, he is the 1983 European silver medalist, 1985 Skate Canada International champion, and competed at the 1984 Winter Olympics in Sarajevo.

Personal life 
Alexander Vasilyevich Svinin was born on 7 July 1958 in Leningrad, Russian SFSR, Soviet Union. He is married to former Soviet ice dancer Irina Zhuk.

Career

As a skater 
Svinin competed with Olga Volozhinskaya for the Soviet Union. Winners of the 1980 Grand Prix International St. Gervais, they made their senior ISU Championship debut later that season at the 1981 World Championships, placing fifth. Volozhinskaya/Svinin were fourth at the 1982 European Championships and sixth at the 1982 World Championships. Their best international results came the next year — silver at the 1983 European Championships and fourth at the 1983 World Championships.

Volozhinskaya/Svinin placed fifth at the 1984 European Championships and were assigned to the 1984 Winter Olympics where they placed seventh. Although no longer sent to ISU Championships, they competed for two more seasons, winning gold at the 1984 Skate Canada International, bronze at the 1984 Prize of Moscow News, and silver at the 1985 Skate Canada International. After retiring from competition, they performed in ice shows in England and the United States.

As a coach 
In collaboration with Irina Zhuk, Svinin began working as a coach and choreographer at Moscow's Sokolniki ice rink. In 2010, they accepted an offer to move to a new rink, Mechta in the Bibirevo District of Moscow.

Svinin and Zhuk's current students include:
 Alexandra Stepanova / Ivan Bukin (2006–present)
 Sofia Shevchenko / Igor Eremenko
 Elizaveta Shanaeva / Devid Naryzhnyy
Their former students include:
 Rebeka Kim / Kirill Minov
 Jana Khokhlova / Sergei Novitski (2003–2010)
 Daria Morozova / Mikhail Zhirnov
 Ekaterina Rubleva / Ivan Shefer
 Ekaterina Pushkash / Jonathan Guerreiro (May 2009 – spring 2010)
 Valeria Starygina / Ivan Volobuiev
 Valeria Loseva / Denis Lunin
 Eva Khachaturian / Igor Eremenko
 Anastasia Shpilevaya / Grigory Smirnov
 Anna Yanovskaya / Ivan Gurianov

Results 
with Volozhinskaya

References

External links 

Russian male ice dancers
Soviet male ice dancers
Russian figure skating coaches
Olympic figure skaters of the Soviet Union
Figure skaters at the 1984 Winter Olympics
Living people
1958 births
Figure skaters from Saint Petersburg
European Figure Skating Championships medalists